Connections Alternative School is a public alternative high school in Eagle Point, Oregon, United States.

Academics
In 2008, 9% of the school's seniors received a high school diploma. Of 33 students, three graduated, 17 dropped out, and 13 were still in high school the following year.

References

High schools in Jackson County, Oregon
Alternative schools in Oregon
Eagle Point, Oregon
Public high schools in Oregon